The canton of Eymoutiers is an administrative division of the Haute-Vienne department, western France. Its borders were modified at the French canton reorganisation which came into effect in March 2015. Its seat is in Eymoutiers.

It consists of the following communes:
 
Augne
Beaumont-du-Lac
Bujaleuf
Château-Chervix
Châteauneuf-la-Forêt
Cheissoux
Coussac-Bonneval
La Croisille-sur-Briance
Domps
Eymoutiers
Glanges
Linards
Magnac-Bourg
Masléon
Meuzac
Nedde
Neuvic-Entier
Peyrat-le-Château
La Porcherie
Rempnat
Roziers-Saint-Georges
Saint-Amand-le-Petit
Sainte-Anne-Saint-Priest
Saint-Germain-les-Belles
Saint-Gilles-les-Forêts
Saint-Julien-le-Petit
Saint-Méard
Saint-Priest-Ligoure
Saint-Vitte-sur-Briance
Surdoux
Sussac
Vicq-sur-Breuilh

References

Cantons of Haute-Vienne